Tadeusz Szamrej (born 17 October 1956) is a Polish sports shooter. He competed in the men's skeet event at the 1996 Summer Olympics.

References

1956 births
Living people
Polish male sport shooters
Olympic shooters of Poland
Shooters at the 1996 Summer Olympics
Sportspeople from Kraków